FIM Motocross World Championship is the premier championship of motocross racing, organized by the Fédération Internationale de Motocyclisme (FIM), divided into two distinct classes: MXGP and MX2. Race duration is 30 minutes plus two laps per race. The series runs 18 events with two races per class at each round.

History

The FIM Motocross World Championship is a worldwide motocross series sanctioned by the F.I.M. It was inaugurated in 1957 using a 500 cc engine displacement formula. In 1962 a 250cc class was added and in 1975, a 125cc class was introduced. Prior to 1957, the championship was known as the European Championship.

In 2004, the F.I.M. changed the displacement formulas to reflect the changes in engine technology and as a move towards environmentally friendlier four-stroke engines. The new MX1 class became the premier class, allowing two-stroke engines of up to 250cc and four-stroke engines of up to 450cc. The MX2 class allowed two-stroke engines of up to 125cc and four-stroke motors of up to 250cc. The MX3 class allowed two-stroke engines of up to 500cc and four stroke engines of up to 650cc.

World Champions by year

|}

World Championships by nationality

Summary

Last updated: 04 September 2022.

500cc / MX3

250cc / MX1 / MXGP

125cc / MX2

Women 

Without the European Championships. Last updated: 04 September 2022.

Riders statistics

World Championships
Update to the end of 2022 season.

GP Wins
Only the victories in the GPs are considered, this result is given by the sum of the results of the single races, when the GP is disputed over two races.

Update to 04 September 2022.

Medal table

Medal table MX

Last updated: 04 September 2022.

Medal table WMX 

Last updated: 04 September 2022.

Grand Prix Nations
Countries that have held Grand Prix as of the 2023 season. 
Countries in bold currently hold a Grand Prix.

  Argentina
  Australia
  Austria
  Belgium
  Brazil
  Bulgaria
  Canada
  Chile
  China
  Croatia
  Czech Republic
  Denmark
  Finland
  France
  Germany
  Greece
  Guatemala
  Hungary
  Indonesia
  Ireland
  Italy
  Latvia
  Japan
  Luxembourg
  Mexico
  Netherlands
  Poland
  Portugal
  Qatar
  Romania
  Russia
  San Marino
  Slovakia
  Slovenia
  South Africa
  Spain
  Sweden
  Switzerland
  Thailand
  Turkey
  Ukraine
  United Kingdom
  United States
  Venezuela
  Vietnam

See also 
 FIM Women's Motocross World Championship
 List of AMA motocross national champions
 Australian Motocross Championship
 British Motocross Championship
 FIM Supercross World Championship
 List of Trans-AMA motocross champions
 List of Motocross riders
 Hawkstone Park Motocross Circuit

Notes

References

External links

 

 
Fédération Internationale de Motocyclisme
World motorcycle racing series
Motorcycle off-road racing series